Sun City is an unincorporated community and census-designated place in Maricopa County, Arizona, United States, that is located within the Phoenix metropolitan area. 

The population was 39,931 as of the 2020 census. Its adjoining sister city is Sun City West. Both Sun Cities are retirement communities popular with snowbirds.

History 
Sun City was opened January 1, 1960, with five home models, a shopping center, a recreation center, and a golf course. The opening weekend drew 100,000 people, ten times more than expected, and resulted in a Time magazine cover story. The future retirement community was built on the site of the former ghost town of Marinette. Developer Del E. Webb expanded Sun City over the years, and his company went on to build other retirement communities in the Sun Belt. Sun City West was built in the late 1970s, Sun City Grand in the late 1990s, Sun City Anthem in 1999, and Sun City Festival in July 2006.

The community is well known to law students, as it is featured in the case Spur Industries, Inc. v. Del E. Webb Development Co., 494 P.2d 700 (Ariz. 1972), commonly used in first-year property law courses to illustrate nuisance law.

The community's street network design consists largely of concentric circles in four main pinwheels.

Geography
It is bordered to the north, east, and south by the city of Peoria, to the southwest by Youngtown, to the west by El Mirage, and to the northwest by Surprise.

Climate

Demographics

According to the census of 2000, there were 38,309 people, 23,490 households, and 12,520 families residing in the CDP. The racial makeup of the CDP was 98.4% White, 0.5% Black or African American, 0.1% Native American, 0.3% Asian, <0.1% Pacific Islander, 0.2% from other races, and 0.4% from two or more races. One percent (1.0%) of the population were Hispanic or Latino of any race.

There were 23,490 households, out of which 0.3% had children under the age of 18 living with them, 49.5% were married couples living together, 3.0% had a female householder with no husband present, and 46.7% were nonfamilies. Individuals comprised 44.1% of all households, and 39.4% had someone living alone who was 65 years of age or older. The average household size was 1.60 and the average family size was 2.07.

In the CDP, 0.4% of the population were under the age of 18, 0.3% from 18 to 24, 2.0% from 25 to 44, 17.5% from 45 to 64, and 79.8% were 65 years of age or older. The median age was 75 years. For every 100 females age 18 and over, there were 69.8 males.

The median income for a household in the CDP was $32,508, and the median income for a family was $40,464. Males had a median income of $35,459 versus $26,453 for females. The per capita income for the CDP was $25,935. About 2.5% of families and 4.6% of the population were below the poverty line, including none of those under age 18 and 4.3% of those age 65 or over.

Sports and recreation
Sun City has eight golf courses and seven recreational centers, and is home to the Sun Bowl Amphitheatre. Sun City's four lawn bowling locations were among the sites for the 2019 US Lawn Bowling Open’s South Central Division. A ballpark, Sun City Stadium, opened in 1971 and served as the spring training home of the Milwaukee Brewers from 1973 to 1985. Other teams to play their home games at the ballpark include the Sun City Rays of the Senior Professional Baseball Association in 1990, and the Mesa Solar Sox of the Arizona Fall League during 1992–1993. The ballpark was razed in 1995.

Transportation
Sun City is served by Valley Metro Bus routes 106 and 138.

Gallery

See also
Sun City, Menifee, California

References

External links

 Surprise Regional Chamber of Commerce
 Del E. Webb Center for the Performing Arts
 Del Webb Sun Cities Museum
 Sun City, Arizona. Demographic and real estate information. Onboard Informatics.

Census-designated places in Maricopa County, Arizona
Retirement communities
Phoenix metropolitan area
1960 establishments in Arizona
Populated places established in 1960